Atala was a cycling team that was created in 1908 and officially retired in 1989. In 1912, the 1912 Giro d'Italia was contested by teams, and Team Atala, consisting of Carlo Galetti, Giovanni Micheletto and Eberardo Pavesi emerged as the winner (Luigi Ganna, also member of the team, retired during the fifth stage).

Major wins

One-day races
Giro di Lombardia
1932: Antonio Negrini 
1961: Vito Taccone

Grand Tours

Tour de France
Stages: (1 in 1932, 2 in 1955, 2 in 1956, 1 in 1958, 1 in 1959)

Giro d'Italia
General Classification:
 1909 - Luigi Ganna 
 1910 - Carlo Galetti 
 1912 - Team Atala (Carlo Galetti, Giovanni Micheletto, Eberardo Pavesi) 
Points Classification:
1984 - Urs Freuler 
Mountains Classification:
 1961 - Vito Taccone 
Stages: (3 in 1909, 7 in 1910, 3 in 1912, 3 in 1948, 3 in 1949, 3 in 1951, 1 in 1954, 3 in 1955, 3 in 1956, 3 in 1957, 4 in 1959, 1 in 1961, 3 in 1982, 3 in 1983, 4 in 1984, 4 in 1985, 3 in 1987, 1 in 1988)

References

External links

Defunct cycling teams based in Italy
Cycling teams established in 1908
Cycling teams disestablished in 1989
1908 establishments in Italy
1989 disestablishments in Italy